Duddell is a surname. Notable people with the surname include:
Blanche Gladys du Bois Duddell, (born 1907, later Gladys Colston, British tennis player, sister of William
George and Frederick Duddell, New York landowners, recognised in name of Duddell Street
Joe Duddell (born 1972), British composer, musician and conductor
William Duddell (1872–1927), English physicist and engineer, brother of Gladys
 Duddell medal and prize, award named for him, awarded by Institute of Physics 1923–2008